Bryan Andrés Soto Pereira (born 1 June 2001) is a Chilean footballer who plays as a midfielder for Deportes La Serena.

Club career
Soto came to Colo-Colo Youth Team at the age of 7. He made his professional debut playing for Colo-Colo in a 2019 Copa Chile match against Deportes Puerto Montt on June 9, 2019. Regarding the domestic leagues, he made his debut fifteen months later in a match against O'Higgins.

International career
He represented Chile U20 in a friendly tournament played in Teresópolis (Brazil) called Granja Comary International Tournament, making appearances in the matches against Peru U20 and Brazil U20.

Honours
Colo-Colo
 Copa Chile: 2019

References

External links

Bryan Soto at playmakerstats.com (English version of ceroacero.es)

2001 births
Living people
Footballers from Santiago
People from Santiago Province, Chile
People from Santiago Metropolitan Region
Chilean footballers
Chile under-20 international footballers
Colo-Colo footballers
Chilean Primera División players
Association football midfielders